Maija Johanna Hassinen-Sullanmaa  (born 2 January 1984) is a Finnish retired ice hockey goaltender and the current goaltending coach and team manager of HPK Kiekkonaiset in the Naisten Liiga. As a member of the Finnish national team, she participated in the women's ice hockey tournament at the 2006 Winter Olympics in Turin and in the IIHF Women's World Championships in 2007, 2008, 2009, and 2011, winning bronze medals at the tournaments in 2008, 2009, and 2011.

Her fourteen-season senior club career was played in the Naisten SM-sarja (renamed Naisten Liiga in 2017) with HPK Hämeenlinna and the Tampereen Ilves. She won the Finnish Championship once with each team, in 2005–06 with Ilves and in 2010–11 with HPK. Hassinen-Sullanmaa is one of the most highly decorated goaltenders in Naisten Liiga history: she was awarded the Tuula Puputti Award as Goaltender of the Year in 2005–06, 2007–08, 2008–09, and 2010–11, the all-time most wins of the trophy; was selected to the All-Star Team in 2007–08, 2009–10, and 2010–11; and received the Karoliina Rantamäki Award as MVP of the Playoffs in 2005–06.

Career statistics

International

Sources:

References

External links
 
 

1984 births
Living people
Finnish women's ice hockey goaltenders
HPK Kiekkonaiset players
Ice hockey players at the 2006 Winter Olympics
Ilves Naiset players
Naisten Liiga (ice hockey) coaches
Olympic ice hockey players of Finland
People from Hämeenlinna
Sportspeople from Kanta-Häme
Naisten Liiga All-Stars